Sapho (1950) is a French-Moroccan singer. Her real name is Danielle Ebguy.

Early life
Born in Marrakech, Morocco, Sapho emigrated to France when she was 16. By age 18, she was living on her own in Paris, taking acting lessons, playing guitar and singing on the streets. A short time later, a musician friend convinced her to audition for famed music school, Le Petit Conservatoire de Mireille. Sapho soon abandoned her acting studies in favor of music. Her first LP, Le Balayeur du Rex, was released in 1977 by RCA.

Career
After spending a year in New York, where she worked as a French reporter and played in different clubs, she went to London to record her second LP, Janis (1980). Sapho released three albums over the next three years, before taking a brief break to concentrate on a book featuring cartoons from the Brasserie La Coupole in Paris.

Sapho returned to music in 1985 with Passions, passons, which saw her leaving the rock sound of her previous albums to embrace the Middle Eastern sounds she had grown up with, leading to a series of concerts at Le Bataclan (Paris). There she began performing her arrangements of songs made popular by the great Egyptian singer Umm Kulthum. The next few years saw Sapho branching out further. Living for a while in Mexico, she released El Sol y la luna, which features a duet with the Argentinian singer, Jairo.

She published two novels, was involved in making a film about the children of the Intifada, and performed in a Threepenny Opera, all the while still performing and recording her own music. Starting in 1992, she focused on the music of Umm Kulthum, releasing a full album of that material and touring the world, even performing in Jerusalem in 1994.

Her next album, Jardin Andalou (1996), blended rock with Arabic and Andalusian elements.  This was followed by Digital Sheikha, a more electronic-based album with Pat Jabbar and the contribution of Bill Laswell, for the Swiss label Barraka el Farnatshi. In 1999, La Route nue des hirondelles was released along with her third novel. She transformed La Route nue des hirondelles into a stage show, which she toured for the next couple of years, while also continuing with the Umm Kulthum material.

Returning to composition, Sapho worked and performed in Bagdad, Jerusalem, Nazareth and Gaza before recording Orients (2003) with a classical orchestra made of Jewish, Muslim and Christian musicians. In 2005, accompanied on stage by a flamenco guitarist, she focused on material by famous French songwriter and composer Léo Ferré. In 2006, the album Sapho chante Léo Ferré – Ferré Flamenco followed, featuring a song translated in Darija (Moroccan Arabic dialect). Her latest album, Universelle, in French, English and Darija is a kind of travel through all of her influences, from blues to traditional sounds.

Discography
 1975 Comment j'm'habille (45 single under the name of Louise Bastien)
 1977 Le balayeur du Rex
 1980 Sapho
 1980 Le Paris stupide
 1982 Passage d'enfer
 1983 Barbarie
 1985 Passions, passons
 1986 Sapho Live au Bataclan
 1987 El Sol y la Luna
 1991 La Traversée du désir
 1995 El Atlal (Sapho chante Oum Kalsoum)
 1996 Jardin andalou
 1997 Digital Sheikha
 1999 La Route nue des hirondelles
 1999 Sapho Live
 2003 Orients
 2006 Ferré Flamenco (Sapho chante Léo Ferré)
 2008 Universelle
 2011 Velours sous la terre
 2018 Sapho chante Barbara
 2022 Jalousie, Amour, Mort (J.A.M.)

Featurings
 2008 Les Feuilles mortes (Jacques Prévert/Joseph Kosma), features on the album Le Retour..., by jazz composer Rodolphe Raffali
 2008 Roman (poem by Arthur Rimbaud), features on the tribute album composed by the didgeridoo player Raphaël Didjaman
 2004 Agir Réagir (Jean-Jacques Goldman/Daniel Berthiaume), collective single produced by the association Juste pour eux and the Secours populaire français to raise funds for the families of the victims of the 2004 Al Hoceima earthquake in Morocco
 1987 Duerme Negrito (South American traditional / lyrics adaptation by Atahualpa Yupanqui) duet with the Argentinian singer: Jaïro, features on the album El Sol y la Luna
 1986 Maman, j'aime les voyous (Guest appearance as the mermaid and soundtrack for Rue du départ, a film directed by Tony Gatlif)

Books
Guerre, Words y Plato, poems, La Différence, 2009 ( / ).
Juste avant de voir, poems and illustrations by Benjamin Levesque, Area, Paris, 2005 ( / ).
Le Livre des quatorze semaines, poems, La Différence, 2004 ( / ).
Un très proche Orient, manifest, Joëlle Losfeld, 2001.
Beaucoup autour de rien, novel, Calmann-Lévy, 1999 ( / ).
Un mensonge, novel, Balland, 1996 ( / ).
Patio, opéra intime, novel, Stock, 1995 ( / ).
Ils préféraient la lune, novel, Balland, 1987 ( / ).
Sous la coupole, drawings, Ultramarine, 1985 ( / ).
Douce violence, novel, Ramsay, 1982 ( / ).

External links

Discography

French women singers
French people of Moroccan descent
20th-century Moroccan Jews
Living people
1950 births